Diego López Reyes (born 6 April 1999) is a Uruguayan professional footballer who plays as a defender for Sud América.

Career
López started out in Sud América's ranks, he was moved into the Segunda División side's first-team for the 2018 season. Having made his professional bow during a home defeat to Cerrito on 12 August, López appeared in further encounters with Miramar Misiones, Oriental, Plaza Colonia and Deportivo Maldonado as Sud América placed seventh.

Career statistics
.

References

External links

1999 births
Living people
Place of birth missing (living people)
Uruguayan footballers
Association football defenders
Uruguayan Segunda División players
Sud América players